Footsteps is a 2003 American made-for-television thriller film directed by John Badham based on the Ira Levin play of the same name. It was broadcast on CBS on October 12, 2003.

Plot
Daisy Lowendahl is a best-selling suspense novelist who has been receiving threatening letters ever since an incident occurred in which a man killed a woman and claimed that he was inspired to do it by one of her novels. At a public even a man angrily accuses her of being responsible for the murder. She is frightened by the man and is plagued by a fear of being attacked when she is alone. At the suggestion of her husband she takes a short vacation at her isolated beach house, where she is visited by Spencer Weaver, a local young fan who knows almost everything about her. Her next visitor is Eddie Bruno, who claims to be a police detective and warns her that Spencer may be dangerous to her. Spencer insists that Eddie is not a cop and after a struggle Eddie is overpowered and tied up. Eddie begins revealing personal details about Daisy, claiming that her husband hired him to kill her that night.

Cast

 Candice Bergen as Daisy Lowenthal
 Michael Murphy as Robbie
 Bryan Brown as Eddie Bruno
 Bug Hall as Spencer Weaver
 John Walf as Boss
 Cindy Sampson as Jordan Hayes
 Suzanne Jacob as Babs
 Johanna MacCulloch as Lauren
 Chase Duffy as Bodyguard #1
 Travis Ferris as Officer
 Bruce Graham as Judge Martin Hickler
 Glen Grant as Police Detective
 Jason Hemsworth as Bodyguard #2
 James Symington as Arresting Officer
 Gary Levert as Male Heckler
 Darcy Lindzon as Tommy
 Rita Malik as Lady in Audience
 Agumeuay Nakanakis as Fisherman
 Juanita Peters as Reporter
 Austin St. John as Police Investigator

Production
After the success of his play Deathtrap, Ira Levin penned the play Footsteps but failed to find anyone to produce it. CBS initially intended to present it as a live theatrical production but ultimately decided that it would have to be adapted into a film due to the need for so many close-ups.

References

External links
 
 

2003 television films
2003 films
2003 thriller films
American films based on plays
Films based on works by Ira Levin
American thriller television films
CBS network films
Films directed by John Badham
Films scored by Christopher Franke
2000s English-language films
2000s American films